The Shakiest Gun in the West is a 1968 American comedy Western film starring Don Knotts. It was directed by Alan Rafkin and written by Jim Fritzell and Everett Greenbaum.  The film is a remake of The Paleface, a 1948 movie starring Bob Hope and Jane Russell.

Plot
Jesse W. Heywood graduates from dental school in Philadelphia in 1870 and goes west to become a frontier dentist. As a "city slicker", he finds himself bungling in a new environment.

On his way west, his stagecoach is held up and robbed by two masked bandits. A posse catches one of them, Penelope "Bad Penny" Cushing. Facing prison, Penelope is offered a pardon if she will track down a ring of gun smugglers that also involves a local Indian tribe. Because the wagon train she plans to accompany will not permit single women to join, she tricks Heywood into a sham marriage.

Jesse, excited for his wedding night and not realizing that his marriage is a sham, looks for Penelope, who is investigating crates of "Bibles" that the Preacher and his minion have in their tent. Jesse startles Penelope, alerting the camp. Her investigation foiled, she goes to bed dragging along her bungling husband.

As the wagon train draws near the town, Indians attack. Jesse fumbles with his six-shooter, but Penelope expertly shoots the attackers. Jesse, believing that he was responsible, is proud of his accomplishment and is treated as a hero by the wagon train and the entire town, which hears of his deeds.

The Preacher, believing Jesse to be an undercover federal agent, hires the local outlaw Arnold the Kid to challenge Jesse to a gunfight. Jesse practices for the gunfight while Penelope meets her contact in town. Around the corner, Arnold listens for Jesse to use up his rounds, and after the sixth shot challenges Jesse, even offering him the first shot. Penelope, feeling pity for Jesse, shoots Arnold from a window. With the killing of Arnold the Kid, Heywood becomes the legendary "Doc the Heywood".

Later that night, Penelope leaves to search the church where the Preacher resides, but Jesse confronts her and demands to know where she is going. Penelope explains her situation and Jesse offers his help, believing himself to be a crack shot. Penelope, not wanting Jesse to hurt himself, tells him the truth about her assistance on the wagon train and with Arnold. Penelope leaves, apologizing to Jesse, who is heartbroken.

Penelope investigates the church and is kidnapped by the Preacher and his minion, who take her to the Indian village outside of town. Meanwhile, Jesse walks into the saloon and admits the truth of his deeds to the town, who laugh at him. As a drunken Jesse stumbles out of the saloon, he sees Penelope being taken out of town by the Preacher. Jesse follows them to the Indian village to save Penelope.

In disguise as an Indian woman, Jesse frees Penelope but suggests they wait for the entire village to get even more drunk before making their escape. Eventually Jesse is discovered and the Preacher and his minion challenge Jesse to a gunfight. Jesse is confident because he knows Penelope is armed and ready in the shadows. As Penelope sets her sights, she is grabbed by two marshals who have come to the village to save her. Two gun shots ring out and Penelope leaves the village, crestfallen, yet Jesse stands victorious with the Preacher and his minion shot dead. Jesse is surrounded by the rest of the village and appears doomed.

Back at the town, the gates are barred and the townspeople prepare for a battle. To everyone's surprise, Jesse rides with the Chief at his side and the remainder of the tribe behind them. Jesse has made peace with the Chief and replaced his missing teeth. He orders the Chief a rare steak and is reunited with Penelope, who hugs him.

Cast
 Don Knotts as Dr. Jesse W. Heywood
 Barbara Rhoades as Penelope 'Bad Penny' Cushings
 Jackie Coogan as Matthew Basch
 Don "Red" Barry as Rev. Zachary Gant (as Donald Barry)
 Burt Mustin as Old Artimus
 Ruth McDevitt as Olive
 Frank McGrath as Mr. Remington
 Terry Wilson as Welsh
 Carl Ballantine as Abel Swanson
 Pat Morita as Wong
 Dub Taylor as Pop McGovern
 Edward Faulkner as Huggins
 Myron Healey as Stage Passenger (uncredited)
 William Christopher as Hotel Manager (uncredited)

Production and release
Filming for the movie, which cost $1.2 million to produce, completed on June 12, 1967 and it opened in Los Angeles on June 26, 1968.

Home media
The film was originally released on VHS in 1988 by GoodTimes Home Video and re-released on VHS in 1996 by MCA Home Video. It was later released on DVD in 2003 by Universal Pictures.

In popular culture
Two scenes in the film parody similar scenes in The Man Who Shot Liberty Valance with John Wayne and James Stewart. The stagecoach holdup scene is the first encounter that both city dudes have with the "Wild West". In the gunfight scene, both "dudes" are about to be gunned down in duels with experienced gunfighters when they are saved by a good guy who kills the villain from a hidden position, making the shooting look like the underdog won a legitimate gunfight.

The plot of the film Beethoven's 3rd revolves around a DVD copy of The Shakiest Gun in the West.

The Shakiest Gun in the West has been cited as one of a number of films which the 2011 animated film Rango consciously draws on.

See also
 List of American films of 1968

References

External links
 
 
 
 
 New York Times review

1968 films
1960s Western (genre) comedy films
American Western (genre) comedy films
Western (genre) film remakes
Remakes of American films
Films directed by Alan Rafkin
Films scored by Vic Mizzy
Films with screenplays by Frank Tashlin
Universal Pictures films
Films about dentistry
1968 comedy films
1960s English-language films
1960s American films